The Mitsubishi Galant Λ (Lambda) is a two-door, four-seater hardtop/notchback coupé built by Mitsubishi from 1976 to 1984. From 1978 it was exported under various names; as the Mitsubishi Sapporo in Europe and South America (named for the Japanese city of Sapporo, which was considered to have positive international connotations after having hosted the 1972 Winter Olympics), the Dodge (Colt) Challenger and Plymouth Sapporo in North America and Puerto Rico, and the Chrysler Sigma Scorpion, Chrysler Scorpion and later the Mitsubishi Scorpion in Australia. It was also sold as a Sapporo in the United Kingdom under the Colt brand.

In 1987, Mitsubishi resurrected the Sapporo name for their Mitsubishi Galant Sapporo, but this was an unrelated front-wheel drive, four-door sedan.

History

Introduced in Japan in December 1976, the Lambda was described not as a coupé but a "personal luxury car", as Mitsubishi already had the Lancer-based Celeste coupé in its line-up. It competed in Japan with the Toyota Crown, Nissan Cedric, Nissan Gloria, and the Mazda Cosmo coupes newly introduced to Japan. In Australia the car was imported from Japan as a flagship model of Chrysler Australia's highly successful Sigma range.

Styling

In the mid-1970s, smaller personal luxury cars were a growing trend, following the success of the Cadillac Seville. Pursuing this idea, the Lambda/Sapporo featured frameless door glass, canopy vinyl roofs, velour interiors, wheel covers with whitewall tires, and every possible power accessory inside. 

In 1980 the second generation featured styled steel wheels with blackwall tires, less chrome trim and interior courtesy lights, fuse box with fuse buiilt-in test light and underseat as well as console storage —' and a radio antenna incorporated into the trunklid.

The wheelbase and bodywork were lengthened with a revised roofline, while remaining within Japanese Government dimension regulations. Revisions offered increased shoulder room, front and rear leg room, head room and trunk capacity — and merited a new chassis code, shifting from A120 to A160. The shifter was moved closer to the driver, and ventilation was improved. The interior provided additional carpeting and acoustic dampening materials and a double-thickness front bulkhead.

Mechanicals
The car was available with a variety of engines, including diesels, a number of normally aspirated gasoline engines, and one of the earliest applications of the long-running turbocharged 2.0 L 4G63T engine in the top GSR model which also featured independent rear suspension. In the North American market, it was available in one basic configuration, which combined the GSR's close-ratio transmission, a live axle rear suspension and a larger engine. Rear disc brakes and alloy wheels were available together as a package. Other US options were minimal; air conditioning, cassette player, automatic transmission, cruise control, power door locks, power mirrors, power windows, and a moonroof.

The American, Australian, and Japanese-market 2.6 L Astron engine helped introduce Mitsubishi's then-new Silent Shaft balance shaft engine technology, which minimized the inherent vibration of a large four-cylinder in-line engine. Japanese buyers were liable for more annual road tax for selecting the 2.6 L engine over the smaller engines. The US version also featured a "Jet Valve", a small secondary intake valve which improved emissions by enhancing swirl in the combustion chamber, allowing for burning of a leaner mixture. A similar engine without the Jet Valve was available in Mitsubishi-built trucks and in the Canadian versions of the Sapporo/Challenger. It also found its way into a large number of Chrysler's K-cars and their derivatives.

Beginning in 1980, Japanese versions of this car were available with electronic fuel injection, or a new 2.3 L Astron turbodiesel engine.

For the 1980 model year (the second generation), the suspension was revised, with improved geometry in front and an all new four-link rear suspension. The turbo models were introduced, of which some came with independent rear suspension (as later applied to the Starion). The second generation also brought variable-assist power steering, which provided greater assistance at low speeds and less at higher speeds.  It was also slightly larger, with increased footroom, headroom, and luggage space.

The Galant Lambda GSR was a predecessor to the more overtly sporting Mitsubishi Starion, which was based on the same chassis and drivetrain. The Starion continued the rear-wheel-drive Galants' model codes, being called the A180, while the new front-wheel-drive Galants started afresh from E10.

North America

The car was marketed in North America as a captive import of the Dodge and Plymouth divisions of Chrysler; the cars differed only in minor details such as taillights, interior trim and available colours. Despite being mechanically identical, the Dodge Colt Challenger was positioned to appeal to the performance market while the Plymouth Sapporo was targeted at the luxury market. To mark its sportier nature, the earliest Dodge Colt Challengers were only available in a two-tone silver/charcoal paint. For 1979 four more color combinations became available. Equipment was very complete for the time, with remote opening trunk, electrically controlled exterior mirrors, map lights, crushed velour seats, etcetera. The larger-engined model came with four-wheel disc brakes as standard; both engines were available with a five-speed manual or a three-speed automatic.

As in other markets, the Challenger/Sapporo received all new bodywork for the 1981 model year. The Dodge versions became simply the Dodge Challenger after 1981, dropping the "Colt" part of the name. An electric sunroof was also new.

Although the car received generally positive reviews, it was not overly successful in the United States. The Challenger and Sapporo were discontinued after the 1983 model year to make way for the products of the newly formed Chrysler-Mitsubishi joint-venture, Diamond-Star Motors, as well as the entrance of Mitsubishi into the American market under its own name. The same platform and 2.6-liter engine under the Challenger and Sapporo was continued through 1989 as the Conquest sports car.

References

External links

Allpar Sapporo/Challenger page
msapporo.com (Sapporo information website)
"Scorpion Sting", Michael Knowling, Autospeed, July 6, 1999
Mitsubishi Motors History Galant Lambda page

Galant Lambda
Rear-wheel-drive vehicles
Mid-size cars
Coupés
Cars introduced in 1976
1980s cars